Serranobatrachus insignitus is a species of frog in the family Strabomantidae. Its common name is ground robber frog. It is endemic to the Sierra Nevada de Santa Marta, Colombia.
Its natural habitats are cloud forests at elevations of  asl. These frogs have been found under logs or rocks on roadsides, or when active, on top of rocks, logs or low vegetation, beside streams. It is threatened by habitat loss.

References

Amphibians of Colombia
Endemic fauna of Colombia
Taxa named by Alexander Grant Ruthven
Amphibians described in 1917
Taxonomy articles created by Polbot